Sierra Leoneans in the United Kingdom are citizens or residents of the United Kingdom who are of Sierra Leonean descent. In 2001, there were 17,048 Sierra Leonean-born residents of the UK.

Background 
Sierra Leonean migration to the UK has a long history, with traders, chiefs, doctors and lawyers sending their children to be educated in Britain in increasing numbers from the mid-19th century. In the late 18th century, the settlement of Freetown, Sierra Leone was established by freed African Americans, Afro Caribbeans, and Black Britons who were evacuated to Sierra Leone. The Province of Freedom was founded with the support of the Committee for the Relief of the Black Poor. This settlement lasted from 1787 to 1789 when it was destroyed by indigenous tribesmen. The city of Freetown was founded in 1792 by Black Nova Scotians who were later joined by Jamaican Maroon freedmen in 1900. Today, their   descendants are the Sierra Leone Creole people.

Migration in the 17th century 
Many British traders in the service of the Royal African Company went to Sierra Leone during the 17th and 18th centuries. Many had children with women from the Sherbro tribe and their descendants can be found in Sierra Leone today. Thus a number of Sierra Leoneans (particularly those from the Sherbro and Creole ethnic groups) can trace their ancestry back to British traders, colonial officials, and former slave traders.

Migration in the 20th century 
There was a small Sierra Leonean population in the UK in the early part of the 20th century and Sierra Leoneans served in the British Armed Forces during World War II. More recent migration from Sierra Leone to the UK has included refugees fleeing the Sierra Leone Civil War. One author states that some 17,000 Sierra Leonean refugees arrived in the UK between 1992 and 2003. Prior to the war, starting in the 1960s, smaller numbers of refugees arrived in the UK. The Sierra Leonean migrant population includes numerous ethnic groups, including Sierra Leonean-Lebanese. Most Sierra Leonean refugees in the UK live in London, with smaller numbers found in Manchester and other major cities.

Migration in the 21st century 
The UK Office of National Statistics recorded 23,000 Sierra Leoneans living in England and Wales in 2011.

Diaspora organisations in the UK 
 Krio Descendants Union London

Notable individuals 
 Michelle Ackerley – Television presenter
 Alberta – Singer
 Paul Barber – Actor, known for playing Denzil in Only Fools and Horses
 Sylvia Barrie – Contestant on Big Brother 9
 Chris Bart-Williams – Former professional footballer
 Tiana Benjamin — Actor in EastEnders
 Billy Boston – Former Welsh rugby player
 James Cleverly – Politician
 Carlton Cole – Professional footballer
 Samuel Coleridge-Taylor – British composer
 John Conteh – Former British boxer
 Curtis Davies – Professional footballer
 Lamin Deen - Bobsledder
 The Dualers – Busking duo
 Idris Elba – Film actor
 Ryan Giggs – Professional footballer, holds most appearances for Manchester United
 Michael Harvey – Musician, former member of So Solid Crew
 Albert Jarrett – Professional footballer
 Len Johnson - Boxer of the 1920s and 1930s
 Steve Kabba – Professional footballer
 Chris Kamara – Former professional footballer, currently a broadcaster
 Malvin Kamara – Professional footballer
 Sheku Kamara – Former professional footballer
 John Keister – Former professional footballer
 Amanda Mealing – Actor
 Nigel Reo-Coker – Professional footballer
 Leroy Rosenior – Former professional footballer
 Liam Rosenior – Professional footballer
 Isha Sesay – News anchor on CNN International
 Kadija Sesay – Literary activist, short story writer and poet
 Danny Wilson – Former Welsh rugby player
 Ib Kamara - Fashion journalist and stylist
Keinan Davis

References 

 
 
Sierra Leonean
Immigration to the United Kingdom by country of origin